Anthidium andinum is a species of bee in the family Megachilidae, the leaf-cutter, carder, or mason bees. It was first described by Peter Jörgensen in 1912.

Distribution
Argentina

References

andinum
Insects described in 1912